Guarea guidonia is a species of flowering plant in the family Meliaceae. It ranges from Cuba and Honduras south to Argentina.

The bark of Guarea rusbyi (Britton) Rusby, a synonym of Guarea guidonia (L.) Sleumer, is used as an expectorant named cocillana.

References

guidonia